Fallout: A Post Nuclear Role Playing Game is a 1997 role-playing video game developed and published by Interplay Productions. In a mid-22nd century post-apocalyptic and retro-futuristic world, decades after a global nuclear war between the United States and China, Fallout protagonist, the Vault Dweller, inhabits the underground nuclear shelter Vault 13. After customizing their character, the player must scour the surrounding wasteland for a computer chip that can fix the Vault's failed water supply system. They interact with other survivors, some of whom give them missions, and engage in turn-based combat where they battle until their action points are depleted.

Tim Cain began working on Fallout in 1994. It began as a game engine based on Steve Jackson Games's tabletop role-playing game GURPS. Interplay dropped the license after Steve Jackson Games objected to Fallout violence, and Cain and designer Christopher Taylor created a new character customization scheme, SPECIAL. Although Interplay initially gave the game little attention, the development ultimately cost $3million and employed up to thirty people. Interplay considered Fallout the spiritual successor to its 1988 role-playing game Wasteland and drew artistic inspiration from 1950s literature and media emblematic of the Atomic Age. The quests were intentionally made morally ambiguous. After three and a half years of development, Fallout was released in North America in October 1997.

Fallout received acclaim for its open-ended gameplay, character system, plot, and perceived original setting. It won "Role-Playing Game of the Year" from GameSpot and Computer Games Magazine, was nominated by the Academy of Interactive Arts & Sciences at the Spotlight Awards, and is often listed among the greatest video games of all time. Fallout has been credited for renewing consumer interest in the role-playing video genre due to its setting, open-ended plot, and gameplay. Fallout was a commercial success, selling 600,000 copies worldwide. It spawned a successful series of sequels and spin-offs, the rights to which were purchased in 2007 by Bethesda Softworks.

Gameplay

Character creation
Fallout is a role-playing video game. The player begins by selecting one of three characters, or one with player-customized attributes. The protagonist, known as the Vault Dweller, has seven primary statistics that the player can set: strength, perception, endurance, charisma, intelligence, agility, and luck. Each statistic may range from one to ten, provided their sum does not exceed 40. Two other statistics set during character creation are skills and traits. All 18 skills are learned abilities, their effectiveness determined by a percentage value. Their initial effectivenesses are determined by the primary statistics, but three can be given a 20% boost. Traits are character qualities with both a positive and negative effect; the player can pick two from a list of sixteen. During gameplay, the player can gather experience points through various actions. For gathering experience points, the player will level up and may increase their skills by a set number of points. Every three levels, the player can grant themself a special ability, or perk. There are 50 perks and each has prerequisites that must be met. For example, "Animal Friend", which prevents animals from attacking the player character, requires the player to be level nine, have an intelligence of five, and have an outdoorsman skill of 25%.

Exploration and combat

In Fallout, the player explores the game world from an isometric perspective and interacts with non-player characters (NPCs). Characters vary in their amount of dialogue; some say short messages, while others speak at length. Significant characters are illustrated with 3D models, known as "talking heads", during conversations. The player can barter with other characters or buy goods using bottle caps as currency. The game has companions that the player can recruit for exploration and combat, although they cannot be directly controlled.

There are three main quests where completion is required, two of them given after completion of the first one. The first main quest has a time limit of 150 in-game days; the game ends if the player fails to complete it within the allotted time. Some characters give the player side quests; if the player solves them, they receive experience points. The player can use the PIPBoy 2000, a portable wearable computer that tracks these quests. Many quests feature multiple solutions; they can often be completed through diplomacy, combat, or stealth, and some allow solutions that are unconventional or contrary to the original task. Based on how they completed quests, the player can earn or lose karma points, which determine how others treat them. The player's actions dictate what future story or gameplay opportunities are available and the ending.

Combat is turn based and uses an action-point system. During each turn, multiple actions may be performed by the player until they run out of action points. Different actions consume different amounts of points. The player can rapidly switch between two equipped weapons, and may acquire a diverse range of weapons, many of which can target specific areas of enemies.  Melee (hand-to-hand) weapons typically have two attacks: swing or thrust. If the player has equipped no weapon, they can punch or kick.

Plot

Setting
On October 23, 2077, a global nuclear war between the United States and China devastated the world and destroyed modern civilizations. The events of Fallout take place nearly a century later in 2161, and follow the Vault Dweller, a human born and raised within Vault 13, one of a number of underground fallout shelters built to protect survivors. Survivors on the surface live off the salvage of the old world.

Vault 13 is located beneath the mountains of Southern California. The Vault Dweller can explore major settlements including Junktown, which is mired in conflict between the local sheriff, Killian Darkwater, and a criminal, Gizmo; the Hub, a bustling merchant city with job opportunities; and Necropolis, a city founded by ghouls, humans who lived in Vault 12 and became nuclear-radiated creatures. The Vault Dweller's journey also brings them into contact with various factions, including the Brotherhood of Steel, a quasi-religious technology-based group with militaristic warriors, the Children of the Cathedral, an optimistic religious cult; and the Super Mutants, an army of virtually immortal monsters immune to radiation.

Characters
The player controls the Vault Dweller, who is sent into the Wasteland to save their vault. The Vault Dweller can be customized or based on one of three pre-generated characters: Albert Cole, a negotiator and charismatic leader with a legal background; Natalia Dubrovhsky, a talented acrobat and intelligent and resourceful granddaughter of a Russian diplomat in the pre-War Soviet consulate in Los Angeles; and Max Stone, the largest person in the Vault who is known for his strength, stamina, and lack of intelligence. The three characters present a diplomatic, deceptive, or combative approach to the game, respectively. Although the character can be male or female, the Vault Dweller is canonically male.

The five companions the player can recruit include: Ian, a guard from Shady Sands; Tycho, a desert ranger; Dogmeat, a tireless loyal dog; and Katja, a member of an organization called the Followers of the Apocalypse. Other major characters include Vault Boy, the mascot of Vault-Tec, who are the creators of the Vaults and the PIPBoy 2000; Killian Darkwater, the mayor and shopkeeper of Junktown; and the Master, leader of the Super Mutants and the main antagonist.

Story
In Vault 13, the Water Chip, a computer component responsible for the Vault's water recycling and pumping machinery, stops working. With only 150 days before water reserves will run dry, the Vault Overseer tasks the Vault Dweller with finding a replacement. Armed with the PIPBoy 2000 and meager equipment, the Vault Dweller leaves Vault 13 for the nearest source of possible help, Vault 15, but finds it abandoned and in ruins. The Vault Dweller explores the wasteland and locates a replacement chip in Vault 12, underneath Necropolis.

The Vault Dweller returns to Vault 13 with the chip and the water system is repaired. The Overseer becomes concerned about the mutants reported by the Vault Dweller. Believing the mutations are too widespread and extreme to be a natural occurrence, the Overseer charges the Vault Dweller with finding and stopping the source of the mutations. Information discovered throughout the wasteland reveals that humans are being captured and turned into Super Mutants by exposure to the Forced Evolutionary Virus (F.E.V.). The Super Mutants are led by the Master, who intends to transform every human into a Super Mutant and establish "unity" on Earth. The Children of the Cathedral are a front created by the Master, who is using them to trick humans into peaceful submission.

To stop the mutations, the Vault Dweller must destroy the vats containing the F.E.V. and kill the Master; the order of the tasks is chosen by the player. The Vault Dweller travels to the Mariposa Military Base to destroy it and the vats within, preventing the creation of more Super Mutants. To kill the Master, the Vault Dweller travels to the Children's Cathedral and locates a prototype Vault beneath it, from which the Master commands his army. The Vault Dweller infiltrates the Vault and can choose to convince the Master that his plan will fail because the Super Mutants are infertile, kill him immediately, or set off an explosion that destroys the Cathedral. The Vault Dweller returns to Vault 13 but is denied entry by the Overseer, who fears that they have been changed by their experiences and the tales of their exploits and accomplishments will encourage the inhabitants to abandon the Vault. The Overseer exiles the Vault Dweller into the wasteland. Fallout concludes with the legacy of the Vault Dweller's decisions on the societies and people they had encountered.

Development

Development on Fallout began in early 1994. Initially, Interplay gave the game little attention, and for the first six months, the programmer Tim Cain was the sole developer. Cain eventually enlisted the aid of Interplay employees during their spare time. The development team behind Fallout—led by Cain, the designer Christopher Taylor, and the art director Leonard Boyarsky—reached 15 people in 1995. In 1996, the producer Feargus Urquhart recruited some Interplay workers to join the team, expanding it to 30. Cain considered the team "amazing" for their dedication, while Urquhart described working under Interplay as "barely controlled chaos".

The tentative title, Vault-13: A GURPS Post-Nuclear Role-Playing Game, was rejected as unfitting. Armageddon was considered as an alternative, but was already in use for another Interplay project (which was later canceled). Interplay's president Brian Fargo suggested the title Fallout . Interplay intended to use "I Don't Want to Set the World on Fire" by the Ink Spots as the theme song, but was hindered by a copyright problem, so another Ink Spots song, "Maybe", was used. The development concluded on October 1, 1997, after three and a half years and a total cost of approximately $3million.

Engine and design

Fallout started as a game engine—a framework for a video game—that Cain was developing during his spare time, based on the tabletop role-playing game Generic Universal RolePlaying System (GURPS). It entered more coordinated development after Cain convinced Fargo of its potential, and Interplay announced it had acquired the GURPS license in 1994. The first Fallout prototype was finished that year.

The team considered making the game first-person and 3D, but discarded the idea because the models would not have held the desired amount of detail. They instead selected an oblique projection, producing a trimetric perspective. Designed to be open-world and non-linear, Fallout was balanced so that, even though side quests are optional, characters who do not improve their skills and experience through them would be too ill-equipped to finish. However, Taylor also added the 150-day time limit to the game to keep the player focused on the main quests.

The game was nearly canceled in late 1994 after Interplay acquired the licenses to the Dungeons & Dragons franchises Forgotten Realms and Planescape, but Cain convinced Interplay to let him finish. After the success of the role-playing video game Diablo, released in January 1997, Cain resisted pressure to convert Fallout into a real-time multiplayer game. In March 1997, Interplay dropped the license for GURPS due to creative differences with GURPS creator Steve Jackson Games. According to Interplay, Steve Jackson objected to the amount of violence and gore. Interplay was forced to change the GURPS system to the internally-developed SPECIAL system; Taylor and Cain were each given a week to design and code it, respectively.

Concept and influences

Prior to the license's termination, the engine for Fallout was based on GURPS. Fantasy and time-traveling settings were considered before the development team decided on a post-apocalyptic setting. Taylor outlined the design goals in a vision statement, which Cain called an inspiration for the development team and "a major reason why the game came together at all."

Fallout was a spiritual successor to Interplay's role-playing video game Wasteland (1988), published by Electronic Arts. Almost everyone who worked on Fallout had played it. The team was unable to make Fallout a direct sequel to Wasteland because Electronic Arts refused to license it. The team drew inspiration for Fallout retro-futuristic art style from 1950s literature and media related to the Atomic Age. Especial influence came from the 1956 science fiction novel Forbidden Planet and optimistic Cold War posters, which Boyarsky reportedly loved.

The vaults were influenced by the underground base in the science fiction movie A Boy and His Dog (1975). Cain said that the team "all loved X-COM" and that Fallout featured combat similar to X-COM prior to the GURPS license. Cain admired Star Control II (1992) and said it influenced Fallout open-ended design. Fallout features many popular culture references. The team was only allowed to include references if understanding the source material was not required for the reference to make sense. For example, the Slayer perk's name references the television series Buffy the Vampire Slayer while generically matching its effect (turning all attacks to critical hits).

Characters and writing
The sprites in Fallout were highly detailed and took up a huge chunk of memory. 21 NPCs were voiced by various actors, and Ron Perlman voiced the narrator. Some NPCs feature 3D models during conversation called "talking heads", most of which were created by Scott Redenhizer. Each took eight weeks to create, and voice recording took a few months. The talking heads began as sculpted heads of clay, which the team studied to determine which parts should be most animated. The heads were digitized using a Faro Space Arm and VertiSketch, with LightWave 3D used for geometric corrections and the texture maps created in Adobe Photoshop. Much of the spoken dialogue was written by designer Mark O'Green, whose method of writing Taylor considered efficient and impressive. The companions, conceived late in development, were not easy to implement. As a result, they were riddled with glitches, including a tendency to shoot the Vault Dweller when they are obscuring an enemy. Dogmeat was the first companion added. Tycho was a reference to the desert rangers from Wasteland.

Cain wrote the prologue, which included the series catchphrase "War. War never changes". Cain, who dislikes it when the player character knows more than the player, devised Fallout narrative so that the Vault Dweller would know just as much as the player. The quests in Fallout were given moral ambiguity, with no clear right or wrong solutions. This was done so the player could take whatever choice suited them best. An example is the final encounter with the Master, whose motives for establishing unity among the wasteland population and making it immune to radiation by turning them into mutants could be perceived as persuasive by the player. Vault Boy and his cheerful nature parodied how 1950s media downplayed the perils of nuclear war.

Release
Boyarsky and lead artist Jason D. Anderson created advertisements for Fallout. Fallout did not have a trailer, but a demo was released on April 26, 1997. The packaging was designed to resemble a lunch box, and the manual was designed to resemble a survival guide to reflect the game's style. Fallout was released on October 10, 1997, in North America for MS-DOS and Windows. The game was later released for Mac OS by the Interplay division MacPlay. Version 1.1 was released on November 13, 1997, patching many bugs in the original release and removing the 500-day time limit. The patch was released for the Mac OS on December 11, 1997.

Fallout was initially not released in Europe due to the player's ability to kill children in-game. Version 1.2 removed the children from Fallout and it was released at an unspecified date in Europe. MacPlay, which had become independent from Interplay, ported Fallout to Mac OS X in 2002 as part of its "Value Series". Fallout and its sequels, Fallout 2 and Fallout Tactics: Brotherhood of Steel, were bundled as Fallout Trilogy in April 2009. To mark its 20th anniversary, the game was made temporarily free on video game digital distribution service Steam on September 30, 2017. It was also included in Fallout Anthology in September and October 2015 and Fallout Legacy Collection in October 2019.

Reception

Fallout received critical acclaim, critics considering it one of the best role-playing video games at the time. PC PowerPlay predicted that Fallout would revive the genre and thought that both casual gamers and fans of role-playing games would enjoy the game. GameSpot declared that because of the release of Fallout, gamers would not have to wait for a good role-playing game anymore. The Electric Playground said that they "can't think of another game that comes even close to Fallout excellent character generation and skill system, great story, and classy delivery."

Critics praised the character system. GamePro considered it the best aspect, and Todd Vaughn of PC Gamer found the system "easy and fun to use." The Washington Post praised the "realistic tradeoffs" during customization.  Computer Games Strategy Plus said the system allowed for a variety of effective character builds, and The Electric Playground and PC PowerPlay praised the game for allowing each skill to be useful. GameSpot felt that "the variety of characters that can be created and the truly different experiences that each type of character can have should satisfy even hard-core RPG players."

The post-apocalyptic setting and story were praised. The setting was lauded as refreshing for a role-playing game; Just Adventure said that Fallout abandoned the traditional fantasy-based settings of many role-playing games. Butcher said the game's appearance, sound, and ambient music delivered a believable environment, and Computer Games Strategy Plus found the mix of satire and grit well-executed. GameSpot and the Independent said the storyline was compelling. Critics commended the cinematic introduction; The Electric Playground called it "the most haunting opening movie" he had seen. Butcher praised the ability to complete quests in multiple ways, and Next Generation found the subquests to be a natural outgrowth of the main quest. Computer Gaming World, however, said the dialogue was unable to account for the player's unpredictability, resulting in out-of-order dialogue. Just Adventure considered the ending among the best in video games.

The combat received a slightly positive reception. Several reviews praised its tactical nature, and GameSpot found the targeting system satisfying. Computer Games Strategy Plus said that fans of turn-based RPGs would greatly enjoy the combat because of the wide variety of weapons. Finding the combat unrealistic, Computer Gaming World said that the turn-based system "might bore or disappoint Diablo fans, but will be welcome to most hard-core RPGers." The companions were criticized because the player could not control them directly. Vaughn said the combat was great when playing without companions and frustrating when playing with them.

Sales
Fallout was commercially successful, although it was not as popular as other role-playing video games such as Baldur's Gate and Diablo. It did not meet sales expectations, but developed a fan following and sold enough copies for a sequel to be produced. In the United States, it debuted at No. 12 on PC Data's computer game sales rankings for October 1997. CNET Gamecenter noted that the game was part of a trend of role-playing successes that month, alongside Ultima Online and Lands of Lore 2: Guardians of Destiny, and said, "If October's list is any indication, [role-playing games] are back." Fallout sold 53,777 copies in the US by the end of 1997.

Worldwide, over 100,000 copies were shipped by December 1997, and Erik Bethke reported sales of over 120,000 copies after a year. By March 2000, 144,000 copies had been sold in the US alone. GameSpot called these "very good sales, especially since the overall [worldwide] figures are likely double those amounts". Fallout was unpopular in the United Kingdom, where sales for it and its sequel totaled just over 50,000 combined lifetime sales by 2008. In 2017, Fargo said in an interview that Fallout sold a total of 600,000 copies.

Awards and accolades
The Academy of Interactive Arts & Sciences nominated Fallout for its "Personal Computer: Role Playing Game of the Year" and "Outstanding Achievement in Sound and Music" awards. Similarly, the Computer Game Developers Conference nominated Fallout for its "Best Adventure/RPG" Spotlight Award. Fallout received GameSpot's "Best Role-Playing Game" and "Best Ending" prize; and was nominated for GameSpot "Game of the Year". It also won Computer Games Magazine "Role-Playing Game of the Year" award.

Legacy

Influence

The 1990s saw a decline in the popularity of computer role-playing games as a result of stale settings and ideas, competition with other genres, and poor quality assurance. Fallout has been credited as one of several innovative role-playing games that revived the genre's popularity. In 2000, CNET Gamecenter Mark H. Walker wrote, "The RPG genre was clearly in a slump in the mid-'90s, but... the renaissance began when Interplay's Fallout hit store shelves." Rowan Kaiser, writing for Engadget, called Fallout the "first modern role-playing game".

Fallout post-apocalyptic setting was novel, as contemporary role-playing games often featured Tolkien-inspired fantasy settings. Fallout also stood out for its focus on the player character, how their choices impacted the game world, and the open-world gameplay. Matthew Byrd of Den of Geek wrote that Fallout departure from gameplay inspired by the tabletop role-playing game Dungeons and Dragons, prevalent in role-playing games at the time, made it influential. Kaiser stated that any modern game with a morality system could be tied back to Fallout. At the 2012 Game Developers Conference, Cain gave a presentation about Fallout development and noted traits that were shared by subsequent role-playing games, including open-world gameplay, ambiguous morality, and perks.

Polygon described Fallout as "one of the most influential games of its time." After leaving Interplay in 1998, Cain, Boyarsky, and Anderson formed Troika Games and created Arcanum: Of Steamworks and Magick Obscura (2001). Cain considered Fallout a "stepping stone" to the creation of Arcanum. Years later, working for Obsidian Entertainment, Cain and Boyarsky created The Outer Worlds (2019), a role-playing video game influenced by Fallout. After the Fallout series became popular, Wasteland 2 (2014) was pitched by Fargo and developed by inXile Entertainment, which Fargo founded, with a design team featuring Anderson and Fallout composer Mark Morgan. PC Gamer found Wasteland 2 to be more similar the first two Fallout games than the original Wasteland. Other personnel from the Fallout development team have worked on games that were influenced by Fallout  such as Neverwinter Nights 2 (2006) and Alpha Protocol (2008). A feature similar to the perks in Fallout, called "feats", was added to the third edition of Dungeons and Dragons. Other games with similar features, according to Cain, include World of Warcraft (2004) and Oblivion (2006). Both Metro 2033 (2010) and Atom RPG (2018) are post-apocalyptic games that were influenced by Fallout. Other games influenced by Fallout include Deus Ex (2000), Dark Angel: Vampire Apocalypse (2001), and Weird West (2022).

Retrospective reception
Fallout continues to receive acclaim, considered one of the best role-playing games on PC. Retrospective critics consider the game innovative and praise its setting as refreshing for a role-playing game. Although The Escapist thought the game lost some of its appeal over time, they found the gameplay "intriguing, sometimes addictive". GamesRadar+ found Fallout worth returning to despite perceiving the game as outdated. Critical assessments of Fallout quality relative to its sequels differ. GamesRadar+ ranked it low among the series, IGN ranked it in the middle, and Kotaku and Paste Magazine ranked it high.

Critics consider the Master one of the best video game villains. GamesRadar+ called the player's encounter with the Master "one of the most striking storytelling devices of its era", and IGN called it one of the series' most memorable moments. GameSpot singled out Jim Cummings's voice acting as the Master as "chilling" and considered him "one of the most memorable antagonists in computer-gaming history." Both Byrd and Eurogamer praised the boss fight for its multiple solutions that took advantage of character system, and PC Gamer said it was among the best in PC gaming.

The game has been inducted into the "Hall of Fame" (or similar award) of Computer Gaming World, GameSpot, GameSpy, and IGN. The 2002 MacPlay ports of Fallout and Fallout 2 was listed under "Best Games Rescued from Oblivion" in Macworld "2002 Game Hall of Fame". Fallout was included in the 2010 reference book 1001 Video Games You Must Play Before You Die and was exhibited in Smithsonian American Art Museum's "The Art of Video Games" under the category of adventure games in March 2011. Fallout has been ranked as one of the best PC games of all time by PC Gamer and IGN. It has also been listed as among the greatest video games of all time by IGN and Polygon.

Series

Fallout was followed by a series of sequels and spin-offs, often different in genre and ambiance from the original game. Cain did not work on any sequels and spin-offs beyond brainstorming for Fallout 2, and left Interplay during its development. Interplay owned the Fallout rights until 2007, when they were purchased by Bethesda Softworks. The first Bethesda-developed Fallout game was Fallout 3. The series has been acclaimed, influential among developers, and among the most popular in the video game industry. Vault Boy became the franchise's mascot and is considered iconic. Other recurring elements include the Super Mutants, the Brotherhood of Steel, the PIPBoy (known as the Pip-Boy in later games), and Power Armor.

Three sequels have been released: Fallout 2 in 1998, Fallout 3 in 2008, and Fallout 4 in 2015. All received positive reviews. Spin-offs include Fallout Tactics: Brotherhood of Steel in 2001, Fallout: Brotherhood of Steel in 2004, Fallout: New Vegas in 2010, Fallout Shelter in 2015, and Fallout 76 in 2018. Fallout Tactics: Brotherhood of Steel and Fallout: New Vegas received positive reviews, while Fallout: Brotherhood of Steel, Fallout Shelter, and Fallout 76 received mixed reviews.

Other media
In 1998, Interplay wrote a script for a film adaptation of Fallout, to be produced by its Interplay Films studio. The adaptation was canceled following the dissolution of Interplay Films in 2000. Throughout 2002, Chris Avellone, a designer of Fallout 2, compiled research of Fallout world and released a series of issues known as the Fallout Bible. Following Bethesda's acquisition of the Fallout franchise, the Fallout Bible became non-canon. Morgan released a remastered soundtrack album for Fallout on May 10, 2010. A television adaptation, with Lisa Joy and Jonathan Nolan as executive producers, was announced in July 2020. In 2022, Amazon approved the show for its streaming service Amazon Prime Video.

See also
History of Western role-playing video games

Notes

References

Sources

External links

Fallout at Bethesda.net
Fallout at MobyGames

1997 video games
Anti-war video games
Classic Mac OS games
DOS games
Fallout (series) video games
Fiction set in the 2160s
Interplay Entertainment games
MacOS games
Open-world video games
Role-playing video games
Satirical video games
Single-player video games
Video games about cults
Video games featuring protagonists of selectable gender
Video games scored by Mark Morgan
Video games set in the 22nd century
Video games set in California
Video games set in Los Angeles
Video games with alternate endings
Video games with isometric graphics
Windows games
Video games developed in the United States